Policy Studies Journal is a quarterly peer-reviewed academic journal published by Wiley-Blackwell on behalf of the Policy Studies Organization and the American Political Science Association's Public Policy Section. The journal was established in 1972. The current editor-in-chief is Dr. Michael D. Jones (University of Tennessee Knoxville). The journal publishes articles on a wide range of public policy issues.  

According to the Journal Citation Reports, the journal has a 2020 impact factor of 5.141, ranking it 17th out of 182 journals in the category "Political Science" and 7th out of 47 journals in the category "Public Administration".

See also 
 List of political science journals

References

External links 
 

Wiley-Blackwell academic journals
English-language journals
Publications established in 1972
Quarterly journals
Political science journals
Policy analysis journals